Posture or posturing may refer to:

Medicine
 Human position
 Abnormal posturing, in neurotrauma
Spinal posture
 List of human positions
 Posturography, in neurology

Other uses
 Posture (psychology)
 Political posturing